Lawrence John Daniels  (11 August 1916 – 16 September 1994) was a senior Australian public servant and policymaker.

Life and career
Laurie Daniels was born in Adelaide on 11 August 1916. He left school, for Sydney, at the age of 17 and won an Australian Public Service job at the Australian Taxation Office (ATO). Daniels moved to Canberra in 1946 with the ATO.

In 1973, Daniels was appointed Secretary of the Department of Social Security, where he stayed until 1977. In 1977 he became Secretary of the Department of the Capital Territory, serving a five-year term.

At the end of his Department of Capital Territory appointment, Daniels retired, having served 47 years in the public service.

Daniels died of cancer on 16 September 1994.

Awards and honours
Daniels was made an Officer of the Order of the British Empire in 1972. In 1979 he was appointed a Companion of the Order of the Bath.

In 2009, the Australian Catholic University established the Laurie Daniels Scholarship to commemorate Daniels' life and his contribution to the University, particularly as a founding member of the University Senate.

References

1916 births
1994 deaths
Australian Companions of the Order of the Bath
Australian Officers of the Order of the British Empire
Australian public servants
Deaths from cancer in Australia